Platycheirus rosarum is a species of hoverfly found in the Palearctic. Like its close relative Platycheirus granditarsus, it can be found in marshy meadows and ditches; indeed, the two species can often be found together. The flight time is between May and October, though it peaks in abundance in June and July.

Description
External images
For terms, see: Morphology of Diptera. Tergite 2 is black. Tergite 3 and sometimes tergite 4 have a divided whitish to yellowish band. Male metatarsus 1 lacks a protuberance. Wings have a violet sheen.

See references for determination.

Distribution
Palearctic: Fennoscandia south to Iberia and the Mediterranean basin, Ireland eastward through Europe to European Russia and Siberia. Nearctic: Alaska to Nova Scotia and south to New Jersey.

Biology
Habitat: River, stream and pond margins with tall herbaceous vegetation and fen. Around the periphery of bogs, Salix swamp.

References

Diptera of Europe
Syrphinae
Insects described in 1787